Soaw is a department or commune of Boulkiemdé Province in central Burkina Faso. As of 2005 it has a population of 17,004. Its capital lies at the town of Soaw.

Towns and villages
SoawBokinKalwakaKolokomMongdinPoésséSéguédinZoétgomdé

References

Departments of Burkina Faso
Boulkiemdé Province